Begum Shahi Mosque, officially The Mosque of Mariyam Zamani Begum, is an early 17th-century mosque situated in the Walled City of Lahore, Punjab, Pakistan. Constructed by Mughal Empress Mariam-uz-Zamani, chief consort of Emperor Akbar, it is one of the largest mosques in Pakistan. The mosque was built between 1611 and 1614 during the reign of Mughal Emperor Jahangir.

It is Lahore's earliest dated Mughal-era mosque. It is known for its exquisite fresco decoration of geometric and floral motifs painted on stucco, along with inscriptions of the names of God. 

Islam has taught about the oneness and infinity of God (Ahad), that He is one and He has divine power, and His oneness is self-evident based on His eternity and omnipresence. Masjids project the principle of tawhid by capturing the concepts of God's infinity and oneness, His divine unity (ahadiyya), and the unity of all creation (wahdat al-wujud) in their architectural designs and decorations. This has been achieved using arches and domes and a regular and even division of space, which reflects the harmonious patterns and cosmic unity in the universe. Masjid Maryam Zamani and Wazir Khan Mosques are true examples of such mosques.

Background
The mosque was built by Queen Maryam Zamani, an empress of the Mughal Emperor Akbar and the mother of Emperor Jahangir. It was constructed during the early period of Jahangir, in 1023 A.H./1614 A.D., as recorded in a Persian inscription fixed on the facade of the northern gate.

Maryam Zamani, a Hindu princess by birth, married into a Muslim community and traded on Christian dominated waterways without being constrained by religious impediments. Her status as a sequestered financier provided her with both the adventure of overseas trade and protection from religious restriction.

This mosque is known in common memory as 'Begum Shahi Mosque' after one of her titles, 'Shahi Begum' ( Empress Consort).

Location
The mosque is located close to the old Masti Gate of the Walled City of Lahore, opposite the eastern walls of the Lahore Fort.

History
This mosque was built as a Jami mosque for those attending the court. Construction began in 1611 and lasted until 1614. The mosque remained frequented for prayer by the Mughal nobility and the common man alike for more than two hundred years until it turned into a gunpowder factory.

During the Sikh rule in Lahore, this mosque was turned into a gunpowder factory by Ranjit Singh, for which it was then known as Barudkhana Wali Masjid ("Gunpowder Mosque"). The gunpowder factory established in the mosque had a full-fledged staff working under the supervision of Jawahar Mal Mistri. 

In 1850 A.D., Major McGregor, then Deputy Commissioner of Lahore, restored the mosque to the Muslims, along with shops and houses attached to it, and it acquired its now official name, "Masjid Mariyam Zamani."

Architecture

The Mosque of Wali Nimat Mariam-uz-Zamani Begum represents a transitional phase of architecture and features both Mughal influences and influences from the earlier Pashtun Lodi Dynasty which had previously ruled the region. Short domes and wide arches represent the earlier Lodi style, while the mosque's balconies, side rooms, and embellishments are in the Mughal style.

The mosque establishes a style that has been seen in subsequent Mughal mosques and buildings: a single-aisled, rectangular space divided into five bays. The mosque's exterior form belongs to a type long popular in Indo-Islamic architecture.

The mosque features Lahore's first five-bay prayer chamber that would later be typical of all later Mughal mosques such as the Wazir Khan Mosque and Badshahi Mosque. The mosque's central bay is in the style of the Persian Char Taq, and is flanked by one smaller dome on either side. The mosque originally had 3 gateways, of which 2 survive.

Layout
The mosque covers an area of land measuring 135 feet 6 inches by 127 feet 6 inches. It is constructed of brick masonry and rendered with plaster and is a massive structure representing a transitional phase of the architecture between the Lodi and the Mughal periods. It has two entrances through deeply recessed arched gateways on its north and east sides. A flight of four steps in each gateway leads down to the main courtyard, measuring 123 feet by 83 feet. The courtyard was originally enclosed by rows of cells on its north and south, some portion of which still exists. On the east, along the gate, is a 17 feet wide platform on which stands an enclosure consisting of an octagonal domed tomb and some other modern graves.

In the center of the courtyard a tank for ablution measuring 31 feet 5 inches by 26 feet 3 inches, is now much repaired. A modern roof of reinforced Badaun and elsewhere in the subcontinent gives us an idea of their gradual development and the perfection which was achieved during the Mughal period.

Design

Interior embellishment
The mosque stands out uniquely for its frescoes, which are significant for their perfect technique and variety of subjects.
The mosque featured the earliest dated Iranian motif in Mughal architecture.

The entire interior surface of the prayer chamber is covered with colourful fresco decoration. At the centre of the main dome is a medallion with radiating stellate and net forms rendered in stucco, completing the exquisite decor of the domes. Similar forms are seen in subsequent Mughal architecture. 

The ceilings of tomb Itimad-ud-Daula, with their richly polychromed net vaulting and stellate forms, are a more refined version of those at Maryam Zamani mosque. The spectacularly painted prayer chamber of Wazir Khan mosque and its interior, as well as the central pishtaq's recessed arch and stellate vaulting, are richly polychromed using a technique similar to that on Maryam Zamani mosque.

This mosque is known for its intricate work and is regarded as the most beautiful of the three great mosques of old Lahore. There is no doubt that the Wazir Khan Mosque is beautiful, as is the huge Badshahi Mosque, but in terms of intricate beauty, none can match the Empress’s Mosque.

Inscriptions
The mosque features primarily four inscriptions of Quranic, and non-Quranic origin. An inscription over the northern gateway features a Persian inscription which reads:

The courtly mosque architecture of Jahangir's period thus bears the stamp of female patronage.

While the inscription over the eastern gateway reads, a prayer of the Queen Mariam-uz-Zamani for her son Jahangir:

Over an archway on the northern end of the mosque is a final inscription that reads:

Conservation
In Pakistan, the mosque has been encroached upon by several shops, and views of the mosque from the Akbari Gate of the Lahore Fort have been obstructed by illegally constructed tire shops. In July 2016, the Walled City of Lahore Authority announced that the shops would be removed, and the mosque would also be conserved and restored.

Gallery

Bibliography

References

Mosques in Lahore
Mughal architecture
Mughal mosques
Walled City of Lahore
Religious buildings and structures completed in 1614
Mosques completed in the 1610s
Mariam-uz-Zamani